SMS V45 was a 1913 Type large torpedo boat (Großes Torpedoboot) of the Imperial German Navy during World War I, and the 21st ship of her class.

Construction
Built by AG Vulcan Stettin shipyard, Germany, she was launched in December 1914. The "V" in V45 denotes at which shipyard she was built.

Service
V45 was assigned to the Sixth Torpedo Boat Flotilla, Twelfth Half-Flotilla, of the High Seas Fleet of the Imperial German Navy. When she participated in the Battle of Jutland she was assigned to escort the battlecruiser . In this action, Lützow was severely damaged such that she was unable to return to German waters.

After the end of hostilities, V45 was interned at Scapa Flow and scuttled. She was salvaged for scrap by Ernest Cox in 1924.

References
 Technical specs of the Großes Torpedoboot 1913 class
 Germany's High Seas Fleet in the World War, Chapter 10c, published by Admiral Reinhard Scheer in 1920

Torpedo boats of the Imperial German Navy
1915 ships
Ships built in Stettin
World War I torpedo boats of Germany
World War I warships scuttled at Scapa Flow
Maritime incidents in 1919